Among the categories of names for sports teams in the United States and Canada, those referring to Indigenous peoples are lesser in popularity only to the names of various animals. In a list of the top 100 team names, "Indians" is 14th, "Braves" is 38th, "Chiefs" is 52nd, "Redskins" is 89th. The typical logo is an image of a stereotypical Native American man in profile, wearing a Plains Indians headdress;  and are often cartoons or caricatures. Other imagery include dreamcatchers, feathers, spears, and arrows. Individual schools may have performance traditions, such as the  tomahawk chop, a mascot or cheerleaders in stereotypical Native attire, and chants adapted from Hollywood movies. These fictional representations stand in the way of any authentic understanding of contemporary Indigenous peoples, and promote racism.

The documents often cited to justifying the trend for change are an advisory opinion by the United States Commission on Civil Rights in 2001 and a resolution by the American Psychological Association in 2005. Both support the views of Native American organizations and individuals that such mascots maintain harmful stereotypes that are discriminatory and cause harm by distorting the past and preventing understanding of Native American/First Nations peoples in the present.

The trend towards the elimination of Indigenous names and mascots in local schools has been steady, with two-thirds having been eliminated during the 50 years prior to 2013 according to the National Congress of American Indians (NCAI). In more recent years, the trend has accelerated, particularly in July 2020, following a wave of racial awareness and reforms in wake of national protests after the murder of George Floyd, and the decision by the Washington Football Team to change their Redskins name and logo.

In a few states with significant Native American populations; such as Colorado, Maine, Nevada, Oregon, 
Washington, and Wisconsin, change has been mandated by law. A law was passed in Connecticut which withholds tribal funding provided by casino revenue from any school that retains a Native mascots after July 1, 2022. Most have complied, but four school districts have decided to keep their mascots; Derby Red Raiders, Killingly Redmen, Windsor Warriors and Nonnewaug High School Chiefs.

The school board in Cambridge, New York voted in June 2021 to eliminate the name and logo of the Cambridge High School "Indians". After the seating of two new members, the board voted to reverse this decision in July 2021. A group of parents favoring removal filed an appeal to the New York State Department of Education which issued an order requiring removal of the mascot or lose state funding. This order applies only to Cambridge, although there are 70 schools in the state that have Native mascots. In a final order, the state Education Commissioner ordered the school to entirely eliminate the mascot by July 1, 2022, citing the evidence that Native mascots "inhibits the creation of 'a safe and supportive environment' for all students". The school board voted 3-2 to file an appeal with the state Supreme Court, arguing that the state Education Commissioner's order singles out Cambridge while allowing other schools to maintain their mascots. It is the state's position that the order to remove the Cambridge mascot alone is in support of the prior board's decision.

The list below for secondary schools in the United States and Canada remains substantial, with 358 teams currently calling themselves "Indians", 113 "Braves", 66 "Chiefs", 156 "Warriors" using Indigenous imagery (there are many with the name using generic, Greek or Roman mascots), and 37 "Redskins". The latter has shown the greatest decline, due to an association with the Washington Redskins name controversy. Since the NFL team began the process of changing its name to the Washington Commanders, nine additional high schools previously using the name also changed. Snell Middle School in Bayard, New Mexico also dropped the name.

Current usage
The following schools are listed in alphabetical order by team name:

Apaches 

 Antonian College Preparatory High School, San Antonio, Texas – a co-educational Catholic high school
 Arcadia High School, Arcadia, California
 Arcola Intermediate School, Eagleville, Pennsylvania
 Arlington Country Day School, Jacksonville, Florida – private college-prep K–12
 Centennial High School, Compton, California
 Fairview High School, Sherwood, Defiance County, Ohio
 Fort Thomas High School, Fort Thomas, Arizona – 93% Native American, adjacent to San Carlos Apache Indian Reservation
 Glenbrook School, Minden, Louisiana – The school was established as a segregation academy when the public Minden High School was desegregated in 1966. While now asserting its nondiscriminatory status, the school remains 92.8 percent white, with no Native American students. Glenbrook has an annual "Apache Princess" pageant.
 Gonzales High School, Gonzales, Texas
 Nogales High School, Nogales, Arizona
 Pottsville High School, Pottsville, Arkansas
 Sanger Union High School, Sanger, California
 Wabash High School, Wabash, Indiana

Arrows
The following use Native American arrows, feathers, or arrowheads in their logos:
 Ashland High School, Ashland, Ohio
 Clinton High School, Clinton, Mississippi
 Lancaster High School, Lancaster, Wisconsin - All schools in the district are the "Flying Arrows".
 Pipestone Area High School, Pipestone, Minnesota - Entire school district is the Arrows with a crossed-arrow logo.
 Preble Shawnee High School, Camden, Ohio  - Entire school district is the Arrows. 
 Sachem High School East, Farmingville, New York
 Sachem High School North, Lake Ronkonkoma, New York - (Flaming Arrows)
 Tecumseh High School, New Carlisle, Ohio
 Watertown High School, Watertown, South Dakota – The prior use of faux Native American costumes was removed from the homecoming festival in 2016, but the arrow in some logos remains.

Aztec(s) 

 Ánimo Leadership Charter High School, Inglewood, California
 Assabet Valley Regional Technical High School, Marlborough, Massachusetts
 Azusa High School, Azusa, California - Azusa Unified School District is debating mascot.
 Barstow High School, Barstow, California
 Copper Canyon High School, Glendale, Arizona
 Corona del Sol High School, Tempe, Arizona
 El Dorado High School, El Paso, Texas
 Esperanza High School, Anaheim, California
 Farmersville High School, Farmersville, California
 Frontier High School, Whittier, California
 La Quinta High School, Westminster, California
 Mark Keppel High School, Alhambra, California
 Mendota Junior High School, Mendota, California
 Montgomery High School, San Diego, California
 Palm Desert High School, Palm Desert, California
 Soledad High School, Soledad, California
 Yerba Buena High School, San Jose, California – mascot: Aztec Warrior
 William Moreno Junior High School, Calexico, California

Big Reds
 Bellaire High School, Bellaire, Ohio - Uses Indian head logo
 Centerville High School, Centerville, Iowa
 Chippewa Valley High School, Clinton Township, Macomb County, Michigan
 Missouri Valley High School, Missouri Valley, Iowa
 Parkersburg High School, Parkersburg, West Virginia
 West Middlesex Jr/Sr High School, West Middlesex, Pennsylvania - Logo is a Native American in a headdress. Girls teams are Ms. Reds.

Blackhawks

Most of the schools with the name use a bird logo, therefore are not directly derived from an Indigenous people although there may be an indirect reference to Chief Black Hawk. The following use Native American images/symbols:
 Adrian High School, Adrian, Missouri
 Baldwin-Woodville Area High School, Baldwin, Wisconsin
 Cheney High School, Cheney, Washington
 Cowan High School, Muncie, Indiana
 Fort Atkinson High School, Fort Atkinson, Wisconsin
 Prairie du Chien High School, Prairie du Chien, Wisconsin
 Stockton High School, Stockton, Illinois
 West Aurora High School, Aurora, Illinois
 Westville High School, New Durham Township, LaPorte County, Indiana

Brave(s)

Brownies 
Agawam High School, Agawam, Massachusetts - With controversy going back decades, the Town Council again voted to retain the Native American imagery associated with their mascot in 2020, disregarding the national trend.

Cherokees 

 Greenback High School, Greenback, Tennessee
 Kendrick High School, Columbus, Georgia
 McMinn County High School, Athens, Tennessee
 Morgan Township Middle-High School, Valparaiso, Indiana
 South-Doyle High School, Knoxville, Tennessee

Chickasaws 

 Blytheville High School, Blytheville, Arkansas
 New Hampton High School, New Hampton, Iowa

Chiefs

Chieftains

Chippewas/Chippewa Raiders

 Chippewa Secondary School, North Bay, Ontario

Choctaws

 Bibb County High School, Centreville, Alabama
 Dyer County High School, Newbern, Tennessee
 West Tallahatchie High School, Webb, Mississippi

Comanche(s) 

 Cahokia High School, Cahokia Heights, Illinois
 Canyon High School, Anaheim Hills, Anaheim, California
 Cahokia High School, Cahokia, Illinois
 Shiner High School, Shiner, Texas
 West Texas High School, Stinnett, Texas

Dine' Warriors 

 Tse Yi Gai High School, Cuba, New Mexico – town is 26% Native American

Eskimos or Eskymos 

 Bowbells High School, Bowbells, North Dakota
 Escanaba Area Public Schools, Escanaba, Michigan – The public schools are all the Eskymos, and have an Indian education program.
 Esko High School, Esko, Minnesota – "Eskomos", logo is an igloo
 Town of Webb High School, Old Forge, New York

Halfbreeds 
 Aniak Jr/Sr High School, Aniak, Alaska

Hurons 

 Rogers City High School, Rogers City, Michigan

Indian(s)

A-E

F-L

M-R

S-Z

Marauders 
 Monache High School, Porterville, California – There is a large mural of a Native American on the side of the school's gym, created by Adam Sanchez, class of 2002. This refers to the high school's mascot, the "Marauder".

Mohawk(s) 

 Bethune-Bowman Middle/High School, Rowesville, South Carolina
 Colebrook Academy, Colebrook, New Hampshire
 James Madison Middle School, Titusville, Florida
 Madison High School, Middletown, Ohio
 McAuley High School, Cincinnati, Ohio
 Marquette High School, Bellevue, Iowa
 Medicine Hat High School, Medicine Hat, Alberta – In 2015 a grade-12 student started a petition to change the name.
 Millis High School, Millis, Massachusetts
 Moravia High School, Moravia, Iowa
 Morley-Stanwood High School, Morley, Michigan
 Morrisonville Jr./Sr. High School, Morrisonville, Illinois
 Northwest High School, McDermott, Ohio
 Piggott High School, Piggott, Arkansas
 St. Wendelin High School, Fostoria, Ohio
 Waldron Junior-Senior High School, Waldron, Indiana

Mohigans 
 Morgantown High School, Morgantown, West Virginia

Red Raiders/Raiders

Redmen 

 Arnprior District High School, Arnprior, Ontario
 Bellevue High School, Bellevue, Ohio
 Bucyrus High School, Bucyrus, Ohio
 Denis Morris Catholic High School, St. Catharines, Ontario
 East Islip High School, Islip Terrace, New York
 Fostoria High School, Fostoria, Ohio
 Killingly High School, Killingly, Connecticut - Renewed discussion in 2019 of whether the mascot is offensive was prompted by a student initiative. After input from the Nipmuc Tribal Council that no Native mascots are flattering, the school board decided to change the name. In October, "Red Hawks" was chosen initially as the new mascot by the Board of Education. However, the name change became an issue in the 2019 municipal elections, leading to record turnout and Republican victories. In December after a contentious meeting the Board decided to have no mascot. In January, 2020 the new school board, now with a Republican majority, voted to reinstate the Redmen mascot. Calling the change and reversion "a mockery of the process", Connecticut Speaker of the House Joe Aresimowicz announced the consideration of legislation to ban all Native American nicknames and logos statewide which would effect 19 high schools, including Killingly.
 Marquette Senior High School, Marquette, Michigan - During a discussion of changing the name Bill Saunders, Superintendent of the Marquette Area Public Schools said “Regardless of what side of that issue you're on, as educators, we see within the school was is a certain amount of bullying and harassment [of Native American students] that's taking place.”
 Parma Senior High School, Parma, Ohio
 Rock Hill Senior High School, Ironton, Ohio
 Sisseton High School, Sisseton, South Dakota
 Smith Center High School, Smith Center, Kansas
 Tewksbury Memorial High School, Tewksbury, Massachusetts

Reds 
 Calaveras High School, San Andreas, California - When a state law required dropping the Redskins, no new name was selected in 2016 and their Native logo was retained. They are now "The Mighty Reds"
 Eaton High School, Eaton, Colorado

Redskins

Renegades 
The term "renegade" was historically used to describe Native Americans who refused to live on reservations and continued to follow traditional lifestyles.
 Shawnee High School, Burlington County, New Jersey

Sachems 

 Middleborough High School, Middleborough, Massachusetts
 Saugus High School, Saugus, Massachusetts
 Laconia High School, Laconia, New Hampshire

Sauras 

 South Stokes High School, Walnut Cove, North Carolina

Savages

 Broken Bow High School, Broken Bow, Oklahoma
 Leflore High School, Leflore, Oklahoma
 Quinton High School, Quinton, Oklahoma
 Salmon High School, Salmon, Idaho
 Salmon River High School, Salmon River, Idaho
 Savannah High School, Savannah, Missouri - The school board voted in 2021 to phase out imagery, but retain the name.
 Sigourney Junior/Senior High School, Sigourney, Iowa
 Tecumseh High School, Tecumseh, Oklahoma
 Wynnewood High School, Wynnewood, Oklahoma

Scouts 
 Lake Forest High School, Lake Forest, Illinois – Some logos use Native American images or spear

Seminoles 

 Creekside High School, Fairburn, Georgia
 Monroe Central High School, Woodsfield, Ohio
 Osceola High School, Osceola, Arkansas
 Salem High School, Conyers, Georgia
 Southeast High School, Bradenton, Florida
 Westside High School, Macon, Georgia
 Toms River Intermediate School South, Beachwood, New Jersey

Senecas 
 Calvert High School, Tiffin, Ohio

Sioux 
 Solen High School, Standing Rock Reservation, Solen, North Dakota
 Westhope High School, Westhope, North Dakota

Squaws
Squaw is a sexualized racial slur against Native women.
 Bellmont High School, Decatur, Indiana – Boys' teams are "Braves"
 Dodge County High School, Eastman, Georgia – Boys' teams are "Indians"
 Jourdanton High School, Jourdanton, Texas – Boys' teams are "Indians"

Thunderbirds 
Although the thunderbird is a creature in Native American mythology, these school's logos/mascots may come from indirect associations with the United States Air Force Thunderbirds or the Ford Thunderbird. 
 Bellevue West High School, Bellevue, Nebraska - Offutt Air Force Base is located in Bellevue
 Circle High School, Towanda, Kansas
 Connetquot High School, Bohemia, New York
 Edsel Ford High School, Dearborn, Michigan - Dearborn is the location of the Ford Motor Company headquarters.
 Johnson County Central High School, Tecumseh, Nebraska
 Legacy High School, Vancouver, Washington
 Mount Tahoma High School, Tacoma, Washington
 North Callaway High School, Kingdom City, Missouri
 Park Crossing High School, Montgomery, Alabama
 Thornwood High School, South Holland, Illinois
 Timpview High School, Provo, Utah
 Tumwater High School, Tumwater, Washington
 Yucaipa High School, Yucaipa, California

Tomahawk(s) 
 Corinth Central High School, Corinth, New York
 Marysville Pilchuck High School, Marysville, Washington - With the passage of a new state law, the Tulalip Tribes leadership requested the change in June 2021. In December 2021 the Tulalip granted permission to keep the name. However, Marysville's Totem Lake Middle School will no longer be the Tomahawks.
 Merrimack High School, Merrimack, New Hampshire

Tribe 
 Chowchilla Union High School, Chowchilla, California

Wamps 
 Braintree High School, Braintree, Massachusetts – Nickname derived from the Wampanoag people

Warrior(s) 

A number of schools with the name "Warriors" never used Indigenous imagery, or changed in response to the controversy.

Prior usage

School closures 
There have been  changes due to school closures or consolidations.

Change decisions 
There have been  changes due to decisions to eliminate discrimination. Note: the year column represents when the old name was dropped.

See also
 Native American mascot controversy
 List of contemporary ethnic groups

References

External links
MascotDB is a searchable database of mascots from Pro to High School.
MaxPreps is a site for U.S. High School sports information, and by team name, but has no indication of current/former usage.
New England Anti-Mascot Coalition

Cultural appropriation
Native Americans in popular culture
Lists of mascots
Lists of names
Lists of sports teams
Sports mascots